The Italian general election of 2008 took place on 13–14 April 2008.

In the Aosta Valley single-seat constituency Roberto Nicco, the incumbent deputy for the centre-left Autonomy Liberty Democracy, was narrowly re-elected, while incumbent senator Carlo Perrin (Valdostan Renewal, Autonomy Liberty Democracy) was defeated by Antonio Fosson (Valdostan Union, Aosta Valley coalition). The parliamentary delegation of Aosta Valley was thus split between the centre-left and the regionalist coalition led by Valdostan Union.

Results

Chamber of Deputies

Source: Ministry of the Interior

Senate

Source: Ministry of the Interior

2008 elections in Italy
Elections in Aosta Valley
April 2008 events in Europe